Mullah Mehrullah Hamad (ملا مهر الله حماد) is the Taliban military leader currently serving as commander of the 205 Al-Badr Corps since 4 October 2021.

References

Year of birth missing (living people)
Living people
Taliban commanders
Afghan military personnel